"Dearie" is a popular song.

Dearie may also refer to:

 Dearie (surname), an American surname
 Dearie Mulvey (20th century), American baseball executive
 Dearie (film), a 1927 silent film starring Irene Rich

See also
 Deary (disambiguation)